The 2016 Furman Paladins team represented Furman University as a member of the Southern Conference (SoCon) during the 2016 NCAA Division I FCS football season. Led by Bruce Fowler in his sixth and final season as head coach, the Paladins compiled an overall record of 3–8 with a mark of 3–5 in conference play, placing sixth in the SoCon. The team played home games at Paladin Stadium in Greenville, South Carolina.

Fowler resigned on December 2. He finished at Furman with a six-year record of 27–43.

Schedule

Game summaries

at Michigan State

at The Citadel

Chattanooga

at Coastal Carolina

Kennesaw State

Samford

at East Tennessee State

at VMI

Wofford

Western Carolina

at Mercer

References

Furman
Furman Paladins football seasons
Furman Paladins football